Aphanius splendens, the Gölçük toothcarp or splendid killifish, is an extinct species of freshwater fish in the family Cyprinodontidae. It was endemic to Lake Gölçük in Turkey. It became extinct due to the effects of fish introduced to the lake.

See Also 
https://www.seriouslyfish.com/species/aphanius-splendens/

References

splendens
Endemic fauna of Turkey
Fish extinctions since 1500
Fish described in 1945
Taxonomy articles created by Polbot